Joseph Crétin (19 December 1799 – 22 February 1857) was the first Roman Catholic Bishop of Saint Paul, Minnesota.  Cretin Avenue in St. Paul, Cretin-Derham Hall High School, and Cretin Hall at the University of St. Thomas are named for him.

Life
He was born in Montluel, in the département of Ain, France, 19 December 1799. He made his preparatory studies in the Petits séminaires of Meximieux (Ain) and Saint-Genis-l'Argentière (Rhône), his studies of philosophy at Alix (Rhône), and of theology in the seminary of Saint-Sulpice, Paris. He was ordained priest 20 December 1823, and soon was appointed vicar in the parish at Ferney, and eventually became its parish priest. He built there a new church and founded a boys' college with funds gathered on a tour through France. At this period, he revived the Catholic faith among parishioners, who had been made indifferent by the proximity of the Protestant cantons of Switzerland. But Crétin longed for a larger field of activity; at one time he thought earnestly of going as a missionary to China. His perplexities in that regard were solved by the advent of his old friend, Bishop Mathias Loras, first bishop of Dubuque, Iowa, who arrived in France in 1838 in search of priests for to evangelize his vast diocese.

Crétin was one of the few who volunteered and on 16 August 1838, he secretly left his parish, embarked at Le Havre with Bishop Loras, and landed in New York in October of the same year. The winter of 1838-39 was spent in St. Louis, Missouri, and on his arrival in Dubuque, 18 April 1839, he was immediately appointed vicar-general of the new diocese. For over eleven years, he exercised his priestly ministry in these new regions, dividing his time between Dubuque, Prairie du Chien, Wisconsin, and the Winnebago Indians in the neighborhood of Fort Atkinson, in Winneshiek County, Iowa. Only once, in 1847, did he absent himself, when he made a trip to Europe in the interest of his missions. In 1850 St. Paul, Minnesota became the seat of a new diocese. Crétin was appointed its first bishop, and went to France, to be consecrated, 26 January 1851, at Belley by Bishop Devie, who had ordained him to the priesthood.

At that time, the diocese, encompassed all of Minnesota and the Dakotas. After having obtained some donations and several ecclesiastics for his new diocese, he returned to America and arrived in St. Paul, 2 July 1851. That evening he made his first appearance in the log chapel of St. Paul, his first cathedral, and gave his first episcopal blessing to his flock. In less than five months a large brick building was completed, which served as a school, a residence, and a second cathedral. Another structure, begun in 1855, was finished after his death, and served as the cathedral of St. Paul until the present Cathedral was completed in 1915. In 1853 a hospital was built. That year, and again in 1856, he bought land for cemetery purposes. For the instruction of children he introduced, in 1851, a community of the Sisters of St. Joseph, and in 1855, the Brothers of the Holy Family. He also planned the erection of a seminary, and always eagerly fostered vocations for the priesthood, keeping at his residence seminarians in their last period of preparation. He supported likewise the cause of temperance not only by personal example, but also by organizing, in January, 1852, the Catholic Temperance Society of St. Paul, the first of its kind in Minnesota. Another of his works was Catholic colonization. With an eye to the future he endeavored to provide for the growth of his diocese by bringing Catholic immigrants from European countries to the fertile plains of Minnesota. Withal he did not neglect his ministerial and pastoral office. He was often alone in St. Paul without the help of priest, and at times travelled through the vast extent of his diocese bestowing on his people the consolations of religion. 

Crétin died at St. Paul, Minnesota, 22 February 1857. Bishop Crétin's memory is held in esteem and veneration, especially by the old settlers of St. Paul.

References

1799 births
1857 deaths
People from Montluel
Roman Catholic bishops of Saint Paul
French emigrants to the United States
Pre-statehood history of Minnesota
19th-century French Roman Catholic priests
19th-century Roman Catholic bishops in the United States
Roman Catholic Archdiocese of Dubuque
Seminary of Saint-Sulpice (France) alumni